COSIX is a Chinese UNIX operating system developed since 1989 by China National Computer Software & Technology Service Corporation (CS&S). A jointly developed 64-bit version with Compaq was released in 1999.

An early version of the COSIX kernel was developed based on UNIX System V, and the 64-bit version was based on Tru64 UNIX. A Linux distribution named COSIX Linux was developed by CS&S and released in 1999, which had no technical relationship to COSIX.

See also
SOX Unix

References

External links
 CS&S Homepage

Unix variants
Science and technology in the People's Republic of China